Truncate coralfish is a common name for several fishes and may refer to:

Chelmonops curiosus, native to the eastern Indian Ocean and western Australia
Chelmonops truncatus, native to eastern Australia